Deh-e Khoshk (also Romanized as Dehkhoshk) is a village in Sar Asiab-e Farsangi Rural District, in the Central District of Kerman County, Kerman Province, Iran. At the 2006 census, its population was 23, in 4 families.

References 

Populated places in Kerman County